BNS Madhumati is a Sea Dragon-class patrol craft of the Bangladesh Navy. This vessel has been serving the Bangladesh Navy since 1998.

Career
Madhumati was built by Hyundai Shipyard, South Korea. She was originally ordered for the Coast Guard in July 1995 and delivered in October 1997. She was commissioned into the Bangladesh Navy on 18 February 1998. The ship is very similar to South Korean Coast Guard vessels, but possesses improved fire equipment and Vosper stabilizers.

In November 2008, Madhumati along with BNS Abu Bakr and BNS Nirbhoy intercepted Myanmar Navy ships at a disputed region of Bay of Bengal where they were supporting an exploration of oil and gas fields.

Madhumati was deployed to Lebanon with the UN mission United Nations Interim Force in Lebanon (UNIFIL) from 17 May 2010 to 14 June 2014. She returned to Bangladesh on 11 August 2014. On her way, she visited the ports of  Salalah and Sultan Qaboos of Oman, Port of Colombo in Sri Lanka and Mumbai and Chennai Port of India on a goodwill mission.

See also
 List of active ships of the Bangladesh Navy

References

Ships built by Hyundai Heavy Industries Group
Sea Dragon-class patrol vessels
1997 ships
Patrol vessels of the Bangladesh Navy